Satin Doll is the fourth studio album by American jazz flautist Bobbi Humphrey recorded in 1974 and released on the Blue Note label.

Reception
The Allmusic review by Andrew Hamilton awarded the album 3½ stars stating "This album isn't as compelling as Blacks and Blues, but is far more impressive than the jazz fusion happening at the same time".

Track listing
All compositions by Larry Mizell except as indicated
 "New York Times" - 6:53 
 "Satin Doll" (Duke Ellington, Johnny Mercer, Billy Strayhorn) - 4:09 
 "San Francisco Lights" (Chuck Davis) - 5:27 
 "Ladies Day" - 6:20 
 "Fun House" (Terry McFaddin, Melvin "Wah-Wah Watson" Ragin) - 4:43 
 "My Little Girl" - 6:45 
 "Rain Again" - 6:56 
 "You Are the Sunshine of My Life" (Stevie Wonder) - 2:43 
Recorded at The Sound Factory, Los Angeles, California on June 20 (tracks 2, 4, 6 & 8), July 22 (tracks 5 & 7) and August 5 (tracks 1 & 3), 1974

Personnel
Bobbi Humphrey - flute, vocals
Fonce Mizell - clavinet, trumpet, vocals 
Jerry Peters - piano, clavinet
Larry Mizell - electric piano synthesizer, clavinet, vocals, arranger, conductor
Phil Davis, Don Preston - synthesizer
Melvin "Wah Wah Watson" Ragin, John Rowin - guitar
Wayne Tweed, Chuck Rainey - electric bass
Harvey Mason  - drums
King Errison - conga
Roger Sainte, Stephanie Spruill - percussion
Chuck Davis, Samantha Harris, Freddie Perren - backing vocals

References 

Blue Note Records albums
Bobbi Humphrey albums
1974 albums
Albums produced by the Mizell Brothers